The Roman Catholic Diocese of Ecatepec (erected 28 June 1995) is a suffragan diocese of the Archdiocese of Tlalnepantla in Mexico. The see city is Ecatepec de Morelos in the state of Mexico.

Ordinaries
Onésimo Cepeda Silva (1995 - 2012)
Oscar Roberto Domínguez Couttolenc, M.G. (since 2012)

References

External links

Ecatepec
Ecatepec, Roman Catholic Diocese of
Ecatepec
Ecatepec
Ecatepec de Morelos